Subirachs may refer to:

134124 Subirachs (2005 AM),  a main-belt Asteroid discovered in 2005
Josep Maria Subirachs (1927–2014), Catalan sculptor and painter of the late 20th century

Catalan-language surnames